Villarrobledo is a Spanish city and municipality in the province of Albacete, part of the autonomous community of Castile-La Mancha. It's better known for having the world's largest area covered by vineyards (more than 30,000 has., approximately 48,000,000 of vines) as well as the world's greatest production of La Mancha wine, called in Spanish Denominación de Origen. Also, it is an important center of Manchego cheese production and export and has other important industries like metallurgy and transportation.

Geography
Villarrobledo is located in the center of La Mancha, a Spanish region with approximately 26.000 km2 of almost perfect plain, on the eastern half of the Submeseta Meridional with elevation between 600 and 800 meters above sea level, and bordered by the Montes de Toledo, Sierra Morena, Sierra de Alcaraz and Serranía de Cuenca.
Altitude: 721 Msl. From 713,5 m (Railway Station) to 739 m (Era de Carrasco).
Land area: 861,25 km2, the 16th in Spain.
Coordinates: 
Rivers: Záncara (tributary of the Guadiana river), Córcoles and Sotuélamos (both tributaries of Záncara river).

Climate
Villarrobledo has a climate that registers extreme temperatures: very low in winter (there have been produced values below −20°) and very high in summer (over 40°). The dominant winds are Solano (from the east) in summer, Cierzo (cold wind from the northwest) in winter and Ábrego (from the southwest) throughout the year. Regardless of these contrasts, the winter cold and the summer heat are dry. Spring and autumn are agreeable.

Slight rainful takes place during spring and at the end of autumn. The annual rainfall average is 39.02 mm. In the summer, rains appear as large isolated storms. Snowfall is not exceptionally great and occurs in December and January, and occasionally in the spring.

Demographics

Population: 26,686 inhabitants.
Demonymes: (In Spanish) Villarrobletano/a or Villarrobledense. Also correct are Villarrobledano/a and Villarrobletense, though they have minor use. Troyano (trojan) is colloquial and Agualubio/a is derogatory.
Entities: City of Villarrobledo and the minor entities of Casas de Peña (<100 hab.), Moharras (deserted) and Ventas de Alcolea (<100 hab.).
Neighborhoods: Asturias (Pío XII), Centro, Juan Valero, San Antón, Socuéllamos, Virgen de la Caridad (Casas Baratas) and Pintores.

At present, there is a notable population increase by the massive immigration of citizens of East Europe. A City Council study in 2006 found the number of immigrants to be 3,324 persons, of whom 2,011 (60.50%) are men, and 1,313 (39.50%) women, arriving from 43 different countries. The ten countries that contribute most to immigration are Romania, Ukraine, Morocco, Moldavia, Colombia, Paraguay, Bolivia, Ecuador, Bulgaria and Peru.

Government

The City Council of Villarrobledo, presided by Spanish Socialist Workers' Party, is made up by the Councillors listed in the right table.

Also, Villarrobledo is head of No. 6 Judicial Party of the province of Albacete, which includes the municipalities of El Bonillo, Munera, Ossa de Montiel and Villarrobledo.

History
The present location of Villarrobledo dates from 1292, according to diverse historical sources. In its history, vestiges of almost all the historical cultures that have existed in the Iberian Peninsula have existed in Villarrobledo, all the way from the Paleolithic to the present.

Archaeological findings

Paleolithic

Between La Jaraba and La Paradica, there are found remains of the first human civilizations in the province of Albacete corresponding to Upper Acheulean (Lower Paleolithic) people. In this place there have been found diverse stone tools, manufactured on nuclei or stone chips, which can be seen in the archaeological section of the Albacete Provincial Museum. There are other five archaeological deposits from the Middle Paleolithic.

Bronze Age
There are many fortified settlements from the Bronze Age, especially in the south zone of the municipal area, related to the Bronze Culture of La Mancha or Motillas Culture

Visigoths

Historically, it is documented in the  the existence of the Church of Lila, (also known as Lipa, Liba or Belida) in las Casas de Lipa (place of La Elipa, less than 10 km to the south of the urban center) assigned to the Bishoprics of Mentesa (Villanueva de la Fuente, Ciudad Real) (3rd to 7th century) and Ergávica (Santaver near Cañaveruelas, Cuenca) (600 to 693).

Modern era
The Battle of Villarrobledo was fought here in 1836.

Natives
 Alonso Ortiz. Renaissantist humanist and writer
 Miguel Cano. Baroque architect and sculptor, father and first master of Alonso Cano, renowned painter and sculptor.
 Diego Morcillo Rubio de Auñón. Spanish Archbishop and twice Viceroy in Peru.
 Tomás de Torrejón y Velasco. Baroque music and Ópera composer.
 Manuel "Champi" Herreros. 80 cc FIM World Champion, in 1989.

References

External links

Tourism Office of Villarrobledo
Carnival of Villarrobledo
Holy Week of Villarrobledo
Viña Rock Music Festival
Villarrobledo from the sky

 Citizen grouping Against the Pollution and the Bad Scents of Villarrobledo

 
Municipalities of the Province of Albacete